Retiro Los Maitenes Airport is an airport  northeast of Retiro, a town in the Maule Region of Chile.

See also

Transport in Chile
List of airports in Chile

References

External links
OpenStreetMap - Los Maitenes
OurAirports - Los Maitenes
FallingRain - Los Maitenes Airport

Airports in Chile
Airports in Maule Region